A pale is a term used in heraldic blazon and vexillology to describe a charge on a coat of arms (or flag), that takes the form of a band running vertically down the centre of the shield. Writers broadly agree that the width of the pale ranges from about one-fifth to about one-third of the width of the shield, but this width is not fixed. A narrow pale is more likely if it is uncharged, that is, if it does not have other objects placed on it. If charged, the pale is typically wider to allow room for the objects drawn there.

The pale is one of the ordinaries in heraldry, along with the bend, chevron, fess, and chief. There are several other ordinaries and sub-ordinaries.

The word pale originally referred to a picket (a piece of wood much taller than it is wide such as is used to build a picket fence) and it is from the resemblance to this that the heraldic pale derives its name.

Derived terms
pallet
In British heraldry when two or more pales appear on a field, they are conventionally termed pallets. While a pallet is generally classified as a diminutive of the pale, the pallets on a shield of two pallets may be no narrower than the pale on another where it has been narrowed to accommodate other charges on either side.   
paly
A shield with numerous pales may be termed paly, especially in early heraldry, though this term is now properly reserved to describe a variation of the field. 
in pale
In pale refers to the appearance of several items on the shield being lined up in the direction of a pale.
palewise
A charge palewise is vertical like a pale.
party per pale
A shield party per pale is divided into two parts by a single line which runs in the direction of a pale.

Special cases
A pale may be couped ("cut off" at either end, and so not reaching the top or bottom of the shield); however, while other charges if couped at the top would just be blazoned as "couped in chief," the special term for this in the case of the pale is "a pale retrait" (this also applies to pallets; see below).  If couped at the bottom it is blazoned as "a pale retrait in base".

The Canadian pale, invented by George Stanley for the flag of Canada, occupies fully half the field.  On a 1:2 flag such as Canada's, it is square.  The name was suggested by Sir Conrad Swan, and used when Elizabeth II proclaimed the new flag on 28 January 1965.

References

Heraldic ordinaries